Wanda Wiecha-Wanot (born 14 May 1946) is a former female Polish volleyball player, a member of Poland women's national volleyball team in 1965–1971, a bronze medalist of the Olympic Games Mexico 1968, silver medalist of the European Championship 1967, three-time Polish Champion (1967, 1969, 1970).

External links
 
 

1946 births
Living people
Polish women's volleyball players
Olympic volleyball players of Poland
Volleyball players at the 1968 Summer Olympics
Olympic bronze medalists for Poland
Olympic medalists in volleyball
People from Dillingen an der Donau
Sportspeople from Swabia (Bavaria)
Medalists at the 1968 Summer Olympics